Bushy Park is a closed station located in the town of Bushy Park, on the Briagolong railway line in Victoria, Australia.

History
The station opened at the same time as the Briagolong railway line in 1889, and was 227 km from Southern Cross. The wattle bark industry was a significant industry in the area, and in 1950 there was a weighbridge for bark at the station. The railway station closed in 1952.

References

Disused railway stations in Victoria (Australia)
Briagolong railway line
Railway stations in Australia opened in 1889
Railway stations closed in 1952
Transport in Gippsland (region)
Shire of Wellington